Clinidium xenopodium is a species of ground beetle in the subfamily Rhysodinae. It was described by R.T. Bell in 1970. It is endemic to the Dominican Republic (Hispaniola).

Clinidium xenopodium measure  in length.

References

Clinidium
Beetles of North America
Insects of the Dominican Republic
Endemic fauna of the Dominican Republic
Beetles described in 1970